The phallotoxins consist of at least seven compounds, all of which are bicyclic heptapeptides (seven amino acids), isolated from the death cap mushroom (Amanita phalloides). They differ from the closely related amatoxins by being one residue smaller, both in the final product and the precursor protein.

Phalloidin had been isolated in 1937 by Feodor Lynen, Heinrich Wieland's student and son-in-law, and Ulrich Wieland of the University of Munich. The remaining six are prophalloin, phalloin, phallisin, phallacidin, phallacin and phallisacin. Though highly toxic to liver cells, phallotoxins have since been found to have little contribution to the death cap's toxicity because they are not absorbed through the gut. Reports of phalloidin in the edible (and sought after) Blusher (Amanita rubescens) have not been confirmed by later researchers

Chemical structures

References 

Mycotoxins found in Basidiomycota
Tryptamines
Cyclic peptides